The following lists the top 25 albums of 2015 in Australia from the Australian Recording Industry Association (ARIA) end-of-year albums chart.

Adele’s album 25 was named the highest selling album in Australia in 2015. The album was released in November and spent six weeks at number one. Ed Sheeran’s album x was number 1 and Taylor Swift’s 1989 was number 2 in 2014; they’re both one spot lower in 2015. Sam Smith’s In the Lonely Hour is the sixth-best-selling album for the second year in a row and Michael Bublé's Christmas appeared in the top 10 end-of-year chart for the fifth consecutive year. 
There were 35 Australian artist releases in the top 100, with Lee Kernaghan’s Spirit of the Anzacs being the best selling Australian album in 2015.

Top 25 

Note: Frozen (soundtrack), Dream Your Life Away, 1000 Forms of Fear  and Christmas peaked at number 1 but not in 2015.

See also 
 List of number-one albums of 2015 (Australia)
 List of Top 25 singles for 2015 in Australia

References

Australian record charts
2015 in Australia
Australia Top 25 Albums